Ebute Ero is a town in Lagos State south-western Nigeria. It is  located in Lagos Island Local Government Area. Ebute Ero is part of Lagos Metropolitan Area.
The town was a major communication link between the new and old citizens of Lagos and a market called Ebute Ero market located in the town is one of the largest and oldest markets in Nigeria.

References

Populated places in Lagos State
Districts of Lagos Metropolitan Area
Lagos Island